Temenos is a former municipality in the Heraklion Regional Unit, Crete, Greece. Since the 2011 local government reform it is part of the municipality Heraklion, of which it is a municipal unit. The municipal unit has an area of 56.608 km2. Population 3,260 (2011). The seat of the municipality was in Profitis Ilias.

Province
The province of Temenos was one of the provinces of the Heraklion Prefecture. Its territory corresponded with that of the current municipality Heraklion (except the municipal unit Gorgolainis and a few other villages) and the municipal unit Archanes. It was abolished in 2006.

References

Provinces of Greece
Populated places in Heraklion (regional unit)